Fortune is a 1980s rock band that had a number of minor hits in the early 1980s including "Airwaves" from The Last American Virgin movie soundtrack and from their second 1985 album release including: "Stacy," "Dearborn Station," and "Thrill of it All."

History

1978–1984: Formation, first studio album and The Last American Virgin
The Fortune Band began in the late 70's when brothers Richard Fortune on guitar and Mick Fortune on drums decided to join together and form a band.  The first Fortune self-titled album was released on Warner Bros in 1978 with follow-up WB singles releases including a cover of funk group The Undisputed Truth's "Squeeze Me, Tease Me" and the original song "Saddle The Wind". In the early 80's, keyboardist Ray Barrett and bassist David de Leon (formerly Stanley Clarke's touring support bassist ) teamed up with the brothers, and the band began its move more toward the pop rock style of the time. This phase of the band capped with a show at Aloha Stadium Summer Blowout 1981, opening for Heart and Blue Oyster Cult. The band began to receive some national attention with the 1982 Columbia Records/CBS Inc. release of "Airwaves" on The Last American Virgin motion picture soundtrack.  The movie is considered by many to be a cult classic of the time and the soundtrack proved to be a memorable compendium of 1980s radio hits with Fortune sharing the bill with bands such as U2, Journey, Blondie, REO Speedwagon and the Police.

As Fortune began to gain momentum, the core of the band, Richard, Mick and David, decided to take their music more mainstream and that some adjustment in personnel was now necessary to move in that direction.  By Fall of 1982, the band had recruited keyboardist Roger Scott Craig. Craig had formerly played with Liverpool Express, a British-based group known in Europe and South America. By end of 1982, Fortune's singer (Richard's wife, Colleen Fortune) had left the band and was replaced by vocalist Larry Greene.

The band began writing all new songs, to which Roger and Larry contributed significantly.  Over the next two years, Fortune spent much of their time in the studio recording demos for CBS records and performing live gigs in clubs around Los Angeles, also opening a stadium show in Hawaii. Unfortunately, the band was unable to get traction during this time and eventually disbanded in 1984.

1985: Second studio album and disbandonment
In 1985, Camel/MCA Records came on the scene and offered to release a Fortune album.  The band regrouped with Bobby Birch on bass.  Greene and Craig had been collaboratively songwriting and landed most of their songs on this second 1985 Fortune album. The album was released, and was believed to have achieved significant sales in Europe and Japan. During this period, Camel/MCA had under-marketed and understated album sales to the band.  While well received by the public, the band itself received virtually no revenue or recognition from the album.  Camel Records shortly thereafter unexpectedly declared bankruptcy for undisclosed reasons and refused to give up the masters of the album, making an album re-release almost impossible.  Fortune disbanded a second time.

2004–2017: Remastering, regrouping and live performances
Fortune's second album was remastered and re-released on Gypsy Rock Records in 2004. This version includes three bonus tracks: one studio track, "Home Free", and two live tracks. The album was remastered and re-released again in 2011 on AOR Heaven with the studio bonus track, "Home Free", only.

The band regrouped again in 2006 as a power trio with original Fortune band members Richard Fortune on vocals/guitar, Mick Fortune on drums/vocals and Dave de Leon on bass/vocals.  The band went back into the studio in mid-2008 to record new songs with plans in the works to release a new FORTUNE album.

In 2016 it was disclosed that Fortune would appear at the three-day Rockingham 2016 melodic/hard rock festival, held in Nottingham, United Kingdom. Fortune appeared on Sunday 23 October, fourth in a seven-act line-up headlined by Kevin Chalfant.

In February 2017 it was announced that Fortune would appear at Rockingham Festival 2017, this to be held at Nottingham Trent University, UK, between 20 and 22 October 2017, the band scheduled to appear on Saturday 21st.

2019–present: New studio album
On April 26, 2019, Fortune released their third studio album and first in 34 years titled, Fortune II.

Style
Fortune's style is similar to that of similar 80's Arena rock artists, such as Journey, Styx, Survivor, Foreigner, and Asia.

Discography

Studio albums
 Fortune (1978)
 Fortune (1985)
 II (2019)
 Level Ground (2022)

Live albums
 The Gun's Still Smokin''' (2020)

Soundtrack appearances
 "Airwaves" (from The Last American Virgin'') (1982)

References

Hard rock musical groups from California
Musical groups established in 1978
Progressive rock musical groups from California